The 2016–17 Green Bay Phoenix men's basketball team represented the University of Wisconsin–Green Bay in the 2016–17 NCAA Division I men's basketball season. The Phoenix, led by second-year head coach Linc Darner, played their home games at the Resch Center as members of the Horizon League. They finished the season 18–14, 12–6 in Horizon League play to finish in a tie for third place. In the Horizon League tournament, they lost to UIC in the quarterfinals. They received an invitation to the College Basketball Invitational where they lost in the first round to UMKC.

Previous season
The Phoenix finished the 2015–16 season 23–13, 11–7 in Horizon League play to finish in fourth place. They defeated Cleveland State, Milwaukee, Valparaiso, and Wright State to win the Horizon League tournament. They received the conference's automatic bid to the NCAA tournament where they lost in the first round to Texas A&M.

Departures

Recruiting class of 2016

Recruiting class of 2017

Roster

Schedule and results

|-
!colspan=9 style=|  Exhibition

|-
!colspan=9 style=|  Non-Conference regular season

|-
!colspan=9 style=|  Horizon League regular season

|-
!colspan=9 style=|Horizon League tournament

|-
!colspan=9 style=|CBI

References

Green Bay Phoenix
Green Bay
Green Bay Phoenix men's basketball seasons
Green Bay Phoenix men's b
Green Bay Phoenix men's b